Terry Euclyn Rollock (born 25 September 1969) is a former Barbadian cricketer.  Rollock was a right-handed batsman who bowled leg break googly.  He was born at Saint Lucy, Barbados.

Rollock made his first-class debut for Barbados against Free State during the South African Provinces tour of the West Indies in 1996.  From the 1996/97 season to the 1997/98 season, he represented Barbados in 11 first-class matches, the last of which came against Trinidad and Tobago.  In his 11 first-class matches, he scored 299 runs at a batting average of 19.93, with a single half century high score 53.  In the field he took 7 catches.  With the ball he took 21 wickets at a bowling average of 23.95, with a single five wicket haul which gave him best figures of 6/15.

During the 2003 English cricket season, Rollock represented the Kent Cricket Board in a single List A match against Derbyshire in the 3rd round of the 2003 Cheltenham & Gloucester Trophy.  In his only List A match, he scored 5 runs and took a single wicket at a cost of 28 runs.

References

External links

1969 births
Living people
Barbadian cricketers
Barbados cricketers
Kent Cricket Board cricketers
People from Saint Lucy, Barbados